Pasaje al amanecer is a 2016 Spanish drama film directed by Andreu Castro and starred by Nicolás Coronado, Iria Calero and Annette Duran. It is the film debut of Andreu Castro.

It is based on the Christmas Eve before the Second Battle of Fallujah in the Iraq War.

Cast

See also
 List of Christmas films

References

External links 
 
  
  

Films shot in Madrid
Spanish Christmas drama films
Iraq War films
Spanish war drama films
2016 war drama films
2010s Christmas drama films